Abbamonte is a surname. Notable people with the surname include:

 Giuseppe Abbamonte (1759–1818), Italian politician
 Lee Abbamonte (born 1978), American blogger and entrepreneur